Rafael Lopez de San Roman Blanco is a professional muralist based in the United States. He has been a studio artist since 2004 and has an extensive exhibition record both nationally and internationally. More recently, Blanco has been transforming his studio background in order to create large-scale public mural paintings in the United States. His medium of choice is a combination of exterior latex house paint and water mixable oils; and once completed, his murals are sealed with a UV and water sealer/protector to ensure their vibrant life for 20–30 years. He blends classic studio painting techniques like glazing with large-scale mural techniques. He also uses computer visual techniques like transparency layers in his mural work and plays with classical and contemporary styles. Blanco is also an Assistant Professor of Art at Elmhurst University and he resides in Aurora, Illinois with his family.

Early life 

Rafael Blanco was born in Alicante, Spain on August 13, 1981 and grew up in Madrid as the youngest of six children. His art is often influenced by his grandfather – a known sculptor in Spain. Blanco often recounts his childhood visiting the National Prado Museum and his fascination with paintings by Velazquez, Goya, Zurbaran, Dali and Picasso, and the remarkable realism in their canvases.

In 2000 at the age of 19, Blanco moved to the United States to attend Florida Southern College in Lakeland, Florida on a full-ride tennis scholarship. He then transferred to Saint Mary's College of California in Moraga, California in 2002 and continued to compete as a college athlete in tennis, where he graduated in 2004 with a B.A. in studio art.

In 2009, Blanco got a job as the Assistant Tennis Coach at the University of Nevada, Reno. Soon shortly after moving to Nevada, Blanco was admitted into the MFA in Art program with an emphasis in drawing and painting. During his third-year of the program as a master of fine arts student, Blanco quit his coaching job to pursue his academic career full-time, until he graduated from the University of Nevada, Reno with his MFA in Art in 2013.

Blanco earned his first full-time teaching job in 2014 as the Art Program Coordinator at Feather River College in Quincy, California. It was at this time, Blanco entered the public art scene.

Murals 

Blanco continues to have studio artwork on display at exhibits (under the artist names of Blanco de San Roman and Rafael Lopez), but it was in 2014 when Blanco participated in his first mural contest (under the artist name Rafael Blanco) where he found his true passion.

24-hour Reno Mural Marathon 

Blanco's 15-foot by 20-foot mural “The Jump” featuring his children, took the second-place prize in the inaugural 24-hour Reno Mural Marathon in Reno, Nevada in 2014. Blanco competed in the 24-hour Reno Mural Marathon again in 2016 and took the second-place prize once more with “Dancing Street.” This 15-foot by 20-foot mural featured two hip-hop street dancers performing in the street. Again, Blanco competed in the fourth annual 24-hour Reno Mural Marathon and took the second-place prize in July 2017 with “Snapshot.” The 15-foot by 20-foot mural featured a person behind a camera lens snapping a photo of its subject looking back at it. Later that fall, in October 2017, Blanco painted “Irma” at the Reno Mural Expo, which was a 20-foot by 20-foot piece and featured the face of an Indigenous woman with a transparent American Flag on her face. In 2019, Blanco made another debut in the 24-hour Reno Mural Marathon when he took the third-place prize with “Frida Kahlo.”

Train Murals 

In 2017, Blanco started the summer with “Railroading Away” in Live Oak, California. This 17-foot by 50-foot mural featured a conductor peering out of a steam engine locomotive preparing to travel. In 2018, trains again are displayed in Blanco's “Western Pacific” mural. Modern locomotives span the 17-foot by 12-foot Western Pacific Railroad Museum building in Portola, California – one of the change sites on the Western Pacific Railroad over the Sierra Mountains.

Diversity Murals 

Blanco's murals tend to focus on critical subjects such as illegal immigration and American patriotism; his thorough research of his subjects give his murals real meaning and bring out cultural heritage.

In June 2018, Blanco started the year painting the “La Michoacana mural,” which featured Latina women dancing in cultural attire and a Hispanic man atop a horse while another Hispanic cowboy plays guitar. This was a 17-foot by 66-foot mural in Lincoln, California that displayed the town's Hispanic Heritage.

The following summer, Blanco painted the “Dorothea Lange” 80-foot by 16-foot mural on the side of a photography business building in Roseville, California. Blanco's research on this forgotten, famous, female depression-era photographer prevailed in his artwork of Lange taking a photo with her 1930s folding camera. This mural also displays a quote by Lange which said, “The camera is an instrument that teaches people how to see without a camera.”

In winter 2019, Blanco painted the “Color Isn’t Race” mural in Denver, Colorado. The seven-foot by 30-foot mural once again showcases Blanco's use of colorful, vertical strips as a backdrop (mainly used as a mapping technique to paint in large scale) and close-up images of four diverse sets of faces. These faces, which showcase different ethnicities, age, gender and race, bring out Blanco's cultural theme in his more recent works.

Identity and human expression are relentlessly present in his pieces, as is the case with the “Sierra Hall” mural on the University of Nevada, Reno campus. In July 2020, Blanco painted a seven-story mural on the Sierra Hall building facing Virginia Street. On the left side of the mural, six sets of human eyes are painted horizontally in a swath of rainbow stripes, representing different races, ages, ethnicities and sexual orientation. The eyes of Colin Kaepernick are represented at the top. On the center column, Blanco painted his own version of a clenched fist that is a symbol of resistance and defiance against social and racial injustices. To the right of this, continues the colorful horizontal stripes with a quote by Audre Lorde that reads, “It is not difference which immobilizes us, but silence.”

In the fall of 2020 in Frederick, Maryland, Blanco painted a mural of famous jazz artist Lester Bowie. Bowie was from Frederick County which brought historical culture to the public mural. Bowie plays the trumpet on the side of the 22-foot by 18-foot building downtown in his then 1960s-typical surgical mask and lab-coat attire.

In 2021, Blanco continued the diversity theme with the “Diversity in Technology” mural in Aurora, Illinois. This 52-foot by 36-foot mural on one of the tallest buildings in downtown Aurora, Illinois features a Black female in a technology-data bubble.

Inspirational Murals 

Inspiring the next generation was Blanco’s theme for murals in 2021. In early summer 2021, Blanco painted “Thinking of you Rockford.” This 22-foot by 77-foot piece in Rockford, Illinois featured a young Black Female dreaming alongside math and science illustrations.

In August 2021, Blanco debuted the “Salem Heritage” mural. This 17-foot by 80-foot mural in Salem, Indiana features portraits of six women who have made significant and historical contributions to Salem. At the same time, Blanco also painted “Resilience.” This eight-foot by eight-foot mural in Fraser, Colorado features a side-view face of a healthcare worker showing the struggles in the field during a pandemic.

In fall 2021, Blanco painted a mural for the Hunger Coalition – a non-profit organization in Bellevue, Idaho. The “Hunger Coalition” 20-foot by 20-foot mural featured the faces of three generations of individuals who have benefited from the organization.

Gallery of Murals

See also 
 Murals
 Public art

References 

Spanish muralists
1981 births
Living people